Nationality words link to articles with information on the nation's poetry or literature (for instance, Irish or France).

Events
 Mark Jarman and Robert McDowell start the small magazine The Reaper to promote narrative and formal poetry.
 Conjunctions literary magazine gets its start one afternoon late this year when founding editor Bradford Morrow sits in Beat poet Kenneth Rexroth's library in Santa Barbara, California talking over the idea of assembling a publication to celebrate James Laughlin, editor of New Directions Publishing. Poets solicited for the publication promise to send in work for future issues of the magazine, not realizing that no magazine is planned at this stage. Morrow then starts the magazine, financing the first few issues himself.
 Three new Hebrew literary journals appear this year in Israel: Mahbarot, edited by Y. Kenaz, Rosh a poetry journal edited by O. Bartena, and Hazerem hehadash, founded by a group of young ex-soldiers.

Works published in English
Listed by nation where the work was first published and again by the poet's native land, if different; substantially revised works listed separately:

Canada

 Roo Borson (American-Canadian):
 In the Smoky Light of the Fields, 
 Rain, 
 Fred Cogswell, A Long Apprenticeship
 Louis Dudek, Cross-Section: Poems 1940-1980. Toronto: Coach House Press.
 Dorothy Farmiloe, Words for My Weeping Daughter
 Robert Finch, Variations and Theme.
 Gail Fox, In Search of Living Things
 Ralph Gustafson, Landscape with Rain
 Irving Layton, For My Neighbours in Hell. Oakville, Ontario: Mosaic Press.
Miriam Mandel, Where Have You Been?. Edmonton: Longspoon Press.
 Joe Rosenblatt, The Sleeping Lady. Exile Editions.
 Raymond Souster, Collected Poems, Volume 1 (1940-55) (first  of a projected ten-volume collection)
 Raymond Souster and Richard Woollatt, eds. Poems of a Snow-Eyed Country. Don Mills, ON: Academic Press.
 Andrew Suknaski, Montage for an Interstellar Cry
 Anne Szumigalski, A Game of Angels
 Tom Wayman, Living on the Ground: Tom Wayman Country, including "Garrison", first prize-winner of the U.S. Bicentennial poetry competition
 Phyllis Webb, Wilson's Bowl

Caribbean
 A. J. Seymour, A Treasury of Guyanese Poetry
 Pamela Mordecai, Mervyn Morris, editors, Jamaica Woman: An Anthology of Poems, Publisher: Heinemann Educational Books
 Lorna Goodison, Tamarind Season
 Mutabaruka, The First Poems: 1970–1979
 Derek Walcott, The Star-Apple Kingdom, St. Lucia native living in and published in the United States

India, in English
 Meena Alexander, Stone Roots ( Poetry in English ), New Delhi: Arnold Heinemann, by an Indian writing and living in the United States
 Dilip Chitre, Travelling In A Cage ( Poetry in English ), Mumbai:Clearing House
 Keki Daruwalla:
 Editor, Two Decades of Indian Poetry 1960-1980, Delhi: Vikas
 Winter Poems ( Poetry in English ), New Delhi: Allied Publishers Pvt Ltd.
 E. V. Ramakrishnan:
 A Python in A Snake Park ( Poetry in English ), New Delhi: Rupa and Co. 
 Being Elsewhere in Myself ( Poetry in English ), Kolkata: Writers Workshop , India.
 Jayanta Mahapatra, The False Start (Poetry in English), Bombay: Clearing House , India .

Ireland
 Eavan Boland, In Her Own Image, Irish poet published in the United Kingdom
 Dermot Bolger, The Habit of Flesh
 Seamus Heaney, Selected Poems 1965-1975, Faber & Faber, Northern Ireland native published in the United Kingdom
 Thomas Kinsella, Poems 1956–1973, Irish poet published in the United Kingdom
 Paul Muldoon, Why Brownlee Left Northern Ireland native published in the United Kingdom
 Tom Paulin, The Strange Museum, including "Pot Burial" and "Where Art Is a Midwife", Faber and Faber, Irish poet published in the United Kingdom

New Zealand
 James K. Baxter, Collected Poems, posthumous
 Charles Brasch, Indirections: a Memoir, 1909-1947,  Wellington ; New York: Oxford University Press, autobiography
 Alistair Campbell, The Dark Lord of Savaiki: Collected Poems, Christchurch: Hazard Press
 Lauris Edmond:
Wellington Letter: A Sequence of Poems
Seven: Poems
Salt from the North
 W. H. Oliver, Out of Season: Poems, Wellington; New York: Oxford University Press, New Zealand
 Alistair Patterson, editor, Fifteen Contemporary New Zealand Poets, anthology
 Ian Wedde, Castaly: Poems 1973–1977

United Kingdom

 Eavan Boland, In Her Own Image, Irish poet published in the United Kingdom
 Alan Brownjohn, A Night in the Gazebo
 David Constantine, A Brightness to Cast Shadows
 Wendy Cope, Across the City
 Donald Davie, In the Stopping Train, and Other Poems
 Lawrence Durrell, Collected Poems: 1931–1974, edited by James A. Brigham
 Gavin Ewart, The Collected Ewart 1933–1980 (see also Collected Poems 1990)
 Elaine Feinstein, The Feast of Eurydice, Faber & Faber/Next Editions
 James Fenton, A German Requiem: A Poem, Salamander Press, a pamphlet
 Roy Fisher, Poems 1955–1980
 John Fuller, The January Divan
 Roy Fuller, The Reign of Sparrows
 Geoffrey Grigson, History of Him
 Seamus Heaney, Selected Poems 1965–1975 (see also New Selected Poems 1990), Northern Ireland native published in the United Kingdom
 Adrian Henri, From the Loveless Matel
 Frances Horovitz, Water Over Stone
 Elizabeth Jennings, A Dream of Spring
 Linton Kwesi Johnson, Inglan is a Bitch
 Thomas Kinsella, Poems 1956–1973, Irish poet published in the United Kingdom
 Laurence Lerner, A.R.T.H.U.R. & M.A.R.T.H.A.; or, The Loves of the Computers, South African native living and published in the United Kingdom
 George MacBeth, Poems of Love and Death
 Norman MacCaig, The Equal Skies
 Pete Morgan, One Greek Alphabet
 Paul Muldoon, Why Brownlee Left, Northern Ireland native published in the United Kingdom
 Tom Paulin, The Strange Museum,  Northern Ireland native published in the United Kingdom
 Kathleen Raine, The Oracle in the Heart, and Other Poems 1975–1978
 Jeremy Reed, Bleecker Street
 Jon Silkin, The Psalms With Their Spoils
 Anthony Thwaite, Victorian Voices
 John Wain, Poems, 1949–1979
 Benjamin Zephaniah, Pen Rhythm, his first published collection

Anthologies in the United Kingdom
 D. J. Enright, editor, The Oxford Book of Contemporary Verse (see above)
 Blake Morrison, editor, The Movement
 Charles Tomlinson, editor, The Oxford Book of Verse in English translation
 Geoffrey Grigson, editor, Oxford Book of Satirical Verse
 Gavin Ewart, editor, Penguin Book of Light Verse
 Valentine Cunningham, editor, Penguin Book of Spanish Civil War Verse

United States
 Meena Alexander, Stone Roots, New Delhi: Arnold Heinemann, by an Indian writing and living in the United States
 A.R. Ammons, Selected Longer Poems
 Ted Berrigan:
 So Going Around Cities: New & Selected Poems
 Carrying a Torch
 Elizabeth Bishop, That was Then, published posthumously (died 1979)
 Philip Booth, Before Sleep
 Joseph Brodsky: A Part of Speech, New York: Farrar, Straus & Giroux Russian-American
 Lucille Clifton, Two-Headed Woman
 George F. Butterick and Richard Blevins, editors, Charles Olson and Robert Creeley: The Complete Correspondence, first volume published this year (ninth and last volume published in 1990), Santa Barbara, California
 Billy Collins, Video Poems
 Allen Ginsberg, Straight Hearts' Delight: Love Poems and Selected Letters, 1947–1980
 Daniel G. Hoffman, Brotherly Love
 Galway Kinnell, Mortal Acts, Mortal Words
 James McMichael, Four Good Things
 William Meredith, The Cheer
 James Merrill, Scripts for the Pageant
 Howard Nemerov, Sentences
 Molly Peacock, And Live Apart
 James Schuyler, The Morning of the Poem
 Frederick Seidel, Sunrise
 Louis Simpson, Caviare at the Funeral
 Mark Strand, Selected Poems, Canadian native living in and published in the United States
 Derek Walcott, The Star-Apple Kingdom, St. Lucia native living in and published in the United States
 Rosmarie Waldrop, When They Have Senses (Burning Deck Press)
 Robert Penn Warren, Being Here: Poetry 1977–1980
 Philip Whalen, Enough Said (Grey Fox Press)
 Ray Young Bear, winter of the salamander (sic)

Criticism, scholarship and biography in the United States
 Justin Kaplan, Walt Whitman (biography)
 Lew Welch, I Remain (letters; Grey Fox Press), posthumous

Other in English
 Lorna Goodison, Tamarind Season, Jamaica
 Philip Salom, The Silent Piano (Fremantle Arts Centre) , Australia
 Chris Wallace-Crabbe, editor, The Golden Apples of the Sun: Twentieth Century Australian Poetry, Melbourne: Melbourne University Press, anthology

Works published in other languages
Listed by language and often by nation where the work was first published and again by the poet's native land, if different; substantially revised works listed separately:

Denmark
 Klaus Høeck, Denmark:
 Bowie, Bowie, with Asger Schnack, publisher: Gyldendal
 Eno One, with Asger Schnack, publisher: Albatros
 Nul (med Asger Schnack og F.P.Jac), publisher: Sommersko
 Renaldo & Clara (med Asger Schnack), publisher: Virkelyst
 Klaus Rifbjerg, Livsfrisen

French language

Canada, in French
 Suzanne Jacob, Poèmes I : Gémellaires, Montréal: Le Biocreux
 Pierre Nepveu, Couleur chair, Montréal: l'Hexagone
 Edmond Robillard, Le temps d'un peu ... : Poèmes, Montréal: Éditions Albert-le-Grand
 Jean Royer, Faim souveraine, l'Hexagone

France
 Yves Bonnefoy, Entretiens sur la poésie, France
 Philippe Denis:
 Carnet d'un aveuglement
 Surface d'écueil
 Emmanuel Hocquard, Une journée dans le détroit
 Edmond Jabès, L'Ineffacable L'Inaperçu
 Abdellatif Laabi, Moroccan author writing in and published in France:
 Le Règne de barbarie. Seuil, Paris (épuisé)
 Histoire des sept crucifiés de l'espoir. La Table rase, Paris
 Jean Max Tixier, editor, publisher: La Table Rase

Germany

West Germany
 Christoph Buchwald, general editor, and Christoph Meckel, Jahrbuch der Lyrik 2 ("Poetry Yearbook 2"), publisher: Claassen; anthology
 Ernst Jandl, Der gelbe Hund
 Johanna Moosdorf, Sieben Jahr sieben Tag
 W. Schubert and K. H. Höfer, editors, Ansichten über Lyrik, anthology, poems and prose since Opitz

East German exiles
 Roger Loewig, Ein Vogel bin ich ohne Flügel
 Thomas Brasch, Der Schöne 27. September
 Günter Kunert, Abtötungsverfahren

Hebrew
 Natan Sach, 
 Dan Pagis, editor, an anthology of medieval Hebrew love poetry
 Mavet ve' ahava, an anthology of Egyptian poetry in Hebrew translation

India
Listed in alphabetical order by first name:
 Gulzar, Kuch Aur Nazme, New Delhi: Radhakrishna Prakashan; Hindi-language
 Kedarnath Singh, Zameen Pak Rahi Hai, Delhi: Prakashan Sansthan; Hindi
 M. Gopalakrishna Adiga, Mulaka Mahasayaru, India, Kannada-language
 Nilmani Phookan, Kavita, Guwahati, Assam: Barua Book Agency, Assamese-language
 Rajendra Kishore Panda, Nija Pain Nanabaya, Samabesha, Bhubaneswar: Prakashani, Oraya-language
 Panna Nayak, Philadelphia; Gujarati-language
 Prabhu Chugani, Surkh Gulab Suraha, a collection of five-line poems in a form invented by him; the book received the Sahitya Akademi Award in 1981, Indian, Sindhi-language

Italian
 Piero Bigongiari, Moses
 Valerio Magrelli, Ora serrata retinae
 Eugenio Montale, L'opera in versi, the Bettarini-Contini edition (published in 1981 as Altri verse e poesie disperse), publisher: Mondadori; Italy
 Edoardo Sanguineti, Stracciafoglio
 Antonio Porta, Passi passaggi
 Maurizio Cucchi, Le meraviglie dell'acqua
 Ugo Reale, Il cerchio d'ombra

Norway
 Ernst Orvil, Nær nok (Norwegian)
 Harald Sverdrup, Fugleskremsel (Norwegian)
 Marie Takvam, Falle og reise seg att (Norwegian)

Poland
 Stanisław Barańczak, Tryptyk z betonu, zmeczenia i sniegu ("Triptych with Concrete, Fatigue and Snow"), Kraków: KOS
 M. Korolko, editor, second edition, anthology
 A. Lam, editor, Ze struny na strune, anthology
 Bronisław Maj, Wiersze ("Poems"); Warsaw: NOWA
 Piotr Sommer, Pamiątki po nas
 Jan Twardowski, Niebieskie okulary ("Blue Sunglasses"), Kraków: Znak

Portuguese language

Portugal
 Mário Cláudio, Estáncias
 Mário Cesariny de Vasconcelos, Primavera Autónomia das Estradas

Brazilian
 Carlos Drummond de Andrade, Esquecer para lembrar (the third volume of his poetic autobiography)
 Mário Chamie
 Astrid Cabral
 Liane dos Santos
 Tarik de Sousa
 Dante de Milano, complete poems
 Paulo Mendes Campos, complete poems
 Afonso Félix de Sousa, book of poems

Russia
 Aleksandr Blok (1880–1921), much of his poetry was republished in this year, his centenary, including a six-volume edition of his collected works and Blok in the Reminiscences of Contemporaries

Spanish language

Spain
 Matilde Camus, Perfiles ("Profiles")
 Antonio Colinas, Astrolabio
 Leopoldo Azancot, La novia judia

Sweden
 Lars Forssell, Stenar
 Ylva Eggehorn, Hjärtats Knytnãvsslag
 Tobias Berggren, Threnos
 Begt Emil Johnson, Vinterminne

Other languages
 Leyzer Aichenrand, Landscape of Fate, Yiddish in Switzerland
 Samih al-Qasim, Je t'aime au gré de la mort, Palestinian
 Simin Behbahani, Khatti ze Sor'at va Atash ("A Line of Speed and Fire"), Persia
 Mairtin O Direain, Danta, including "Deiradh Re", "Cuimhne an Domhnaigh", and "Cranna Foirtil", Gaelic-language, Ireland

Awards and honors
 Nobel Prize in Literature: Czesław Miłosz, Polish poet, translator, literary critic, and (since 1951) exile.

Australia
 Kenneth Slessor Prize for Poetry: David Campbell, Man in the Honeysuckle

Canada
 See 1980 Governor General's Awards for a complete list of winners and finalists for those awards.
 Prix Émile-Nelligan: Claude Beausoleil, Au milieu du corps l’attraction s’insinue (poèmes 1975-1980)

United Kingdom
 Cholmondeley Award: George Barker, Terence Tiller, Roy Fuller
 Eric Gregory Award: Robert Minhinnick, Michael Hulse, Blake Morrison, Medbh McGuckian

United States
 Academy of American Poets Fellowship: Mona Van Duyn
 AML Award for Poetry to Emma Lou Thayne for "Once in Israel"
 Pulitzer Prize for Poetry: Donald Justice, Selected Poems (April 14)
 American Academy of Arts and Letters: John Ashbery elected a member of the Literature Department
 Fellowship of the Academy of American Poets: Mona Van Duyn
 Walt Whitman Award of the Academy of American Poets: Jared Carter

Spanish
 Premios de la Crítica awards in poetry:
 Castilian: Luis Rosales, Diario de una resurrección
 Catalan: Miquel Martí i Pol, Estimada Marta
 Galician: Eduardo Moreiras, O libro dos mortos
 Basque: Juan Mari Lekuona, Ilargiaren eskolan

Deaths

Birth years link to the corresponding "[year] in poetry" article:
 January 3 – George Sutherland Fraser (born 1915), Scottish poet and critic
 February 12 – Muriel Rukeyser, 66 (born 1913), American, of a heart attack
 February 25 – Robert Hayden, 66, American poet, essayist, and educator, of a heart ailment
 March 25 – James Wright, 52, American, of cancer
 March 31 – Vladimir Holan, 74, Czech
 April 21 – Sohrab Sepehri (born 1928), Persian poet and painter
 April 30 – Luis Muñoz Marín (born 1898), Puerto Rican poet, journalist and politician
 June 20 – Amy Key Clarke (born 1892), English mystical poet
 July 9 – Vinicius de Moraes (born 1913), Brazilian writer, poet and diplomat
 July 25 – Vladimir Vysotsky (born 1938), Russian singer-songwriter, poet and actor
 August 9 – Denis Glover (born 1911), New Zealand poet and publisher
 September 2 – Frederick T. Macartney (born 1887), Australian
 September 25 – Marie Under (born 1883), Estonian
 October 18 – Martin Haley (born 1905), Australian poet, essayist, translator and schoolteacher
 October 25 – Sahir Ludhianvi (born 1921), Urdu/Hindustani poet and Hindi film lyricist
 November 21 – A. J. M. Smith (born 1902), Canadian
 November 28 – Julia Reynolds, 98

See also

 Poetry
 List of years in poetry
 List of poetry awards

Notes

 Britannica Book of the Year 1980 ("for events of 1979"), published by Encyclopædia Britannica 1980 (source of many items in "Works published" section and rarely in other sections)

20th-century poetry
Poetry